This is a list of motorcycles manufactured by Moto Guzzi.

Current and recent models

2003 saw the start of a substantial revitalization in Moto Guzzi's lineup and engineering work, beginning with the launch of a new V-twin in three displacements, the first Euro 3 compliant engine in the world. A succession of new models has followed.
 Bellagio (936 cc) (since 2007): named after a town across Lake Como from the Moto Guzzi headquarters — features custom styling, and a matt-black paint scheme. With a  standard riding position, the Bellagio was introduced at EICMA 2006 (tentatively named the "940 Custom"), along with a new 1,200 cc, 8-valve engine, a 940 cc 4-valve engine, the new Griso 1200 and Norge 850. Though not currently available in North America, a recent Piaggio press release indicates the Bellagio is key to Guzzi's North American presence
 Breva is named after the breeze called the Breva that blows across Lake Como, where the Moto Guzzi factory is situated.  The motorcycles were manufactured in four configurations: 750, 850, 1100 and 1200. The three larger models differ from the 750, featuring CARC suspension and enhanced performance.
 Breva 750 i.e. or Breva  V 750 i.e. (744 cc) (2002-2009): The Breva was the first motorcycle developed and marketed by Moto Guzzi after the company became a subsidiary of Aprilia. As a  standard motorcycle, the Breva 750 was formally introduced to the press at Intermot 2002, Munich. With its ease of maintenance, durability and even, flat torque curve, the engine design remains suitable to everyday, real-world situations. To mark the rejuvenation of Moto Guzzi, the first Breva 750 was delivered to its owner on April 7, 2003 in a special ceremony at the Mandello works. Likewise, the first 100 Breva 750's were delivered to their Italian dealers in a special ceremony on March 26, 2003 at Mandello del Lario headquarters on the occasion of the company's anniversary.
 Breva 850 (877 cc) (since 2006): a variation featuring the 850 engine, not available in the US.
 Breva 1100/1100 ABS (1,064 cc) (since 2005): introduced in Europe in 2005 and in the US in 2006. Breva 1100 ABS not available in the US.
 California
 California 1400 Touring (1,380 cc) – The hard bagger version of the new California 1400 - With classic transversal V2 architecture and introducing technologies new to the Moto Guzzi brand including ride-by-wire throttle, cruise control, and traction control.
 California 1400 Custom (1,380 cc) - Pared-down version of the 1400 California, sans hard bags and windshield and with drag-style handlebars, also utilizing the new v2 1400 engine.
 MGX21 Flying Fortress for 2017 this bagger model is largely based on the California 1400 (1,380 cc) model the frame and associated pieces have been tweaked just slightly to accommodate the larger 21-inch front wheel and anticipated load and real carbon fiber used for all bodywork.
 Audace (1,380 cc) - a sportier, matt-black/red version based on the California, with drag bars and footpegs. Comes with the standard rider modes, three stage traction control and ABS Brembo brakes.  
 Griso
 Griso 1100 (1,064 cc) (since 2005): literally "gray one", named after a gray-bearded character in the famous Italian literature saga The Betrothed—a riding posture between sport and standard; first saw light as a prototype at EICMA 2003 in Milan, when Moto Guzzi was still owned by Aprilia. After Piaggio absorbed Moto Guzzi, they proceeded (in house) to quickly develop the Griso for production, adapting Guzzi's historic V-twin engine to the new bike. In keeping with the bike's hard-edged, techno-custom styling, an oversized oil radiator graces the right side of the engine, in plain view.
 Griso 8V – In September 2007 at GMG, Moto Guzzi introduced the Griso 8V, featuring a heavily revised engine with four valves per cylinder. Motorcycle News wrote: "in doing so, the striking-looking Griso has been transformed from a lumbering yet evocative old-school roadster into a charging rhino of a motorcycle with true  potential."  At 1,151 cc, the engine has been heavily revised, and the bike now features an unusual exhaust with a "8" cross-section at the rear, revised brakes, handlebars and seat.
 Griso 850 (877 cc) (since 2006): variation of the Griso with the 850 engine, not available in the US.
 Nevada Classic 750 i.e. (744 cc) (since 2004): named after the previous Guzzi Nevada (1991–2001) — first available May 2004; meets Euro 3 emissions standard; low seat height (760 mm);  standard riding posture, light weight (184 kg dry); suitable for around town, short and medium distance touring; compared to previous carburetted model: 383 components out of a total of 441 components redesigned or renewed; the only "entry-level" custom with shaft drive, electronic injection; very similar in spec to the Breva 750 (since 2010 Nevada Anniversario).
 Norge
 Norge 850 (877 cc) (since 2007) a variation of the Norge model, equipped with the 850 engine, not available in the US.
 Norge 1200 (1,134 cc) (since 2005): a GT (Gran Turismo) bike that derives its name from the original GT Norge famous for making a 4,000-mile (6,400 km) test ride in 1928—from the company headquarters in Italy to just inside the Arctic Circle of Norway's Capo Nord — to prove its suspension prototype: the world's first rear swingarm suspension. Moto Guzzi celebrated the 2005 Norge introduction by re-tracing the 1928 ride. Reinforcing Moto Guzzi's history, the design of the Norge and its fairing was refined in the company's historic wind tunnel at the Mandello del Lario headquarters.
 Stelvio 1200 (1,134 cc) (since 2008): named after the famous Stelvio Pass in the Italian Alps, this adventure touring type of dual sport motorbike is directly aimed at the market defined by the highly successful BMW GS. It is currently (2011) available in two versions: the Stelvio ABS and the Stelvio NTX. Whilst both models of Stelvio can be said to be toward the road-biased end of the adventure touring spectrum, the NTX version has been fitted with parts that make it more suitable to rough terrain (spoked wheels, sump guard, crash rails).
Neither is available in the US.
 MGS-01 Corsa (1,222 cc) (since 2004) (track only): a very limited production racing bike — introduced at Intermot 2002 (Cologne Motorcycle Show) as a prototype. The bike had been designed starting in 2002 with the Moto Guzzi Style Laboratory and a team at Ghezzi & Brian—with co-founder Giuseppe Ghezzi. As a pure racing bike, the MGS-01 Corsa was originally intended for a domestic Italian homologation model, though has since been raced (successfully) also in the US. Production was be highly limited, with bikes shipped in special wooden crates carrying a special MGS-01 logo on the outside and a personalized spiral-bound and owners, parts and maintenance manual. Moto Guzzi continues to supply engines to Ghezzi & Brian for their own line of production custom bikes.

Recent awards and victories

  Norge, August 31, 2007: Winner, Granturismo category, "Motorcycle of the Year Awards" by Motociclismo
  California Vintage and Bellagio, August 31, 2007: Cruiser category, second and third after the HD Night Rod, "Motorcycle of the Year Awards" by Motociclismo.
  The 1200 Sport, 2007: 2nd Place, Naked category, German fortnightly “Motorrad.” 
  Norge, March 2007, "Granturismo of the Year" by the readers of the weekly "Motosprint" and the monthly "In Moto". 
  The 1200 Sport, second place in the Naked Category German fortnightly "Motorrad"
  At Daytona, Gianfranco Guareschi riding a Moto Guzzi MGS-01 Corsa twice won The Formula 1 class of the BOT (Battle of Twins) race on 6 and 7 March 2006. 
  MGS-01 Corsa: October 2006: Gianfranco Guareschi, riding a Moto Guzzi MGS01, became Italian Supertwins Champion.

Historic models

The company has produced over fifty models since its inception. One of its most famous machines has been the Le Mans. This model was a further development of the 1971 750 V7 Sport designed by Guzzi engineer Lino Tonti. The V7 Sport was planned as the first five speed, production motorcycle. It signified a major step forward in the design of a more sporting Guzzi, with a more compact frame being made possible by replacement of the dynamo, sitting high between the cylinders, with an alternator sited on the end of the crank at the front of the engine. The 750S and 750 S3 followed, but it was the 850 Le Mans, with its disc brakes and additional displacement, that lived up to the promise of the V7 Sport and really caught the public's imagination. When the Le Mans debuted in 1976 it was among the 5 best performing road bikes available.

Six versions of the Le Mans have been produced, designated: Le Mans, Le Mans Mk II, Le Mans Mk III, LeMans Mk IV, Le Mans Mk V and V11 Le Mans. The Le Mans, II and III are 850 cc, the IV and V are 1,000 cc and the V11 Le Mans is 1,064 cc. The first two models had rounded air-cooling fins on the barrels while the latter have squared fins (known as "round-fin" and "square-fin"). All models have shaft drive. Early models use 36 mm or 40 mm Dell'Orto carburettors but the late model V11 Le Mans are fuel injected. All the machines in this series are highly regarded for their styling and performance.

Moto Guzzi introduced the California models in 1972, based on the model sold to the Los Angeles Police Department – combining European performance and maneuverability coupled with American styling. The California remained popular throughout the 1980s and 1990s and remains in the US Moto Guzzi range as the California Vintage.

 The last year of the 1100 Sport was fuel injected.

Racing models

Military models

 G.T. 17 (500 cc) 1932 - 1939
 G.T. 20 (500 cc) 1938
 Alce (500 cc) 1939 - 1945
 Trialce (500 cc) (motocarro) 1940 - 1943
 Superalce (500 cc) 1946 - 1957
 Falcone militare (500 cc) 1950 - 1967
 Airone militare (250 cc) 1940 - 1957
 Autoveicolo da montagna 3 X 3 (754 cc) 1960 - 1963
 V7 militare (700, 750, 850, 1,100 cc) 1967 - 20..
 Nuovo Falcone militare (500 cc) 1970 - 1976
 V 50 PA (500, 350, 650 cc) 1983 - 20..
 750 NTX (750 cc) 1990 - 20..
 Breva 750 2006 Municipal Police Model

References

Moto Guzzi